Provincial Highway 39 is a Taiwanese highway that starts from Xinhua, Tainan City and ends in Alian District, Kaohsiung. The highway connects THSR Tainan Station with Tainan City and northern Kaohsiung City, and runs along the underpass of the elevated viaduct for high-speed rail.

See also
 Highway system in Taiwan

References

External links

Highways in Taiwan